The Serie B 1975–76 was the forty-fourth tournament of this competition played in Italy since its creation.

Teams
Piacenza, Modena and Catania had been promoted from Serie C, while Vicenza, Ternana and Varese had been relegated from Serie A.

Final classification

Results

References and sources
Almanacco Illustrato del Calcio - La Storia 1898-2004, Panini Edizioni, Modena, September 2005

Serie B seasons
2
Italy